Edogestrone (developmental code name PH-218), or edogesterone, also known as 17α-acetoxy-3,3-ethylenedioxy-6-methylpregn-5-en-20-one, is a steroidal progestin and antiandrogen of the 17α-hydroxyprogesterone group which was synthesized in 1964 but was never marketed. Similarly to the structurally related steroid cyproterone acetate, edogestrone binds directly to the androgen receptor and antagonizes it, displacing androgens like testosterone from the receptor, though not as potently as cyproterone acetate. The drug has also been found to suppress androgen production, likely via progesterone receptor activation-mediated antigonadotropic activity.

See also 
 Steroidal antiandrogen
 List of progestogens
 List of steroidal antiandrogens
 List of progestogen esters

References 

Abandoned drugs
Acetate esters
Antigonadotropins
Pregnanes
Progestogen esters
Progestogens
Spiro compounds
Steroidal antiandrogens